William "Bill" August Kooistra (August 26, 1926 – March 30, 1995) was an American water polo player who competed in the 1952 Summer Olympics and in the 1956 Summer Olympics.

He was born in Chicago and is the older brother of Sam Kooistra.

Kooistra was a member of the American water polo team which finished fourth in the 1952 tournament. He played seven matches.

Four years later he finished fifth with the American team the 1956 tournament. He played five matches.

In 1976, he was inducted into the USA Water Polo Hall of Fame.

References

External links
 

1926 births
1995 deaths
American male water polo players
Olympic water polo players of the United States
Water polo players at the 1952 Summer Olympics
Water polo players at the 1956 Summer Olympics